HMS B2 was one of 11 B-class submarines built for the Royal Navy in the first decade of the 20th century.

Design and description
The B class was an enlarged and improved version of the preceding A class. They displaced  on the surface and  submerged. The B-class submarines had a crew of two officers and thirteen ratings.

For surface running, the boats were powered by a single 16-cylinder  Vickers petrol engine that drove one propeller shaft. When submerged the propeller was driven by a  electric motor. They could reach  on the surface and  underwater.

The boats were armed with two 18-inch (450 mm) torpedo tubes in the bow. They could carry a pair of reload torpedoes, but generally did not as they would have to remove an equal weight of fuel in compensation.

Construction and career
B2 was built by Vickers at their Barrow-in-Furness shipyard, launched on 30 October 1905 and completed on 9 December 1905. She was commanded by Lieutenant P.B. O’Brien, and was one of several submarines sent to Dover to take part in Channel exercises during the extended lead up to the First World War. B2 was surfaced and was struck just forward of the conning tower. The accident resulted in the deaths of 15 crew members. The only survivor was the boat's bridge officer, Lt. Pulleyne. The boat was not recovered in order to allow the bodies to remain undisturbed. In recent years the wreck was discovered by amateur divers.

Notes

References

External links
'Submarine losses 1904 to present day' - Royal Navy Submarine Museum

British B-class submarines
World War I submarines of the United Kingdom
Ships built in Barrow-in-Furness
Royal Navy ship names
1905 ships
British submarine accidents
Submarines sunk in collisions
Maritime incidents in 1912
Shipwrecks in the North Sea
Protected Wrecks of the United Kingdom